Benjamin S. Hale is an environmental philosopher and ethicist. He is currently Associate Professor of Philosophy and Environmental Studies at the University of Colorado–Boulder, as well as a faculty affiliate at the university's Center for Science and Technology Policy Research.

Hale is a former president of the International Society for Environmental Ethics and is currently co-editor of the journal Ethics, Policy & Environment.

References

External links 
 Ben Hale's faculty web page

University of Colorado Boulder faculty
Year of birth missing (living people)
Place of birth missing (living people)
Environmental philosophers
Living people